Simona Halep defeated Sloane Stephens in the final, 3–6, 6–4, 6–1 to win the women's singles tennis title at the 2018 French Open. It was her first major title, following three previous runner-up finishes. Halep became the second Romanian woman to win a major singles title after Virginia Ruzici in 1978. She also became the sixth woman to win both the junior and senior titles at the tournament, having won the former in 2008.

Jeļena Ostapenko was the defending champion, but was defeated in the first round by Kateryna Kozlova. This made her only the second French Open champion (after Anastasia Myskina in 2005) to lose in the first round of her title defense.

Halep retained the WTA No. 1 singles ranking after defeating fellow contender Garbiñe Muguruza in the semifinals. In addition to Halep and Muguruza, Caroline Wozniacki, Elina Svitolina, Karolína Plíšková and Caroline Garcia were also in contention for the top ranking.

This was the first major singles appearance for future French Open champion Barbora Krejčíková. This also was the last major appearance of 2010 champion Francesca Schiavone, who lost to Viktória Kužmová in the first round. This was the final French Open appearance of former world No. 1 and two-time champion Maria Sharapova, who lost to Muguruza in the quarterfinals.

This tournament marked the first time that Agnieszka Radwańska did not play in the main draw of a singles major since her debut at the 2006 Wimbledon Championships, ending a streak of 47 consecutive appearances.

This was Serena Williams' first major appearance since the 2017 Australian Open due to her pregnancy and maternity leave. She was unseeded in a singles major for the first time since the 2007 Australian Open. Williams reached the fourth round before withdrawing prior to her match against Sharapova due to a pectoral muscle injury, ending her streak of 10 consecutive major quarterfinals dating back to the 2014 US Open.

Seeds

Qualifying

Draw

Finals

Top half

Section 1

Section 2

Section 3

Section 4

Bottom half

Section 5

Section 6

Section 7

Section 8

Championship match statistics

References

External links
2018 French Open – Women's draws and results at the International Tennis Federation

Women's Singles
French Open by year – Women's singles
French Open – Women's singles